Mario García Sáiz (born 21 March 1999) is a Spanish footballer who plays as a left back for CD Tropezón.

Club career
García was born in Santander, Cantabria, and represented Racing de Santander and Girona FC as a youth. He made his senior debut with Girona FC B (which was at the time the C-team) on 27 May 2018, playing the last 15 minutes of a 1–0 Segona Catalana home win against UE Marca de L'Ham.

On 23 July 2018, after finishing his formation, García signed for Tercera División side CD Tropezón. On 7 August 2020, after two seasons as a regular starter, he moved to CD Mirandés and was assigned to the reserves also in the fourth division.

García made his professional debut on 19 September 2020, coming on as a late substitute for Bojan Letić in a 1–1 home draw against Real Oviedo in the Segunda División. On 19 July of the following year, after being sparingly used for the B's, he returned to Tropezón, with the side now in the Segunda División RFEF.

References

External links

1999 births
Living people
Spanish footballers
Footballers from Santander, Spain
Association football defenders
Segunda División players
Tercera División players
Divisiones Regionales de Fútbol players
Girona FC B players
CD Mirandés B players
CD Mirandés footballers